Plasy is a town in Plzeň-North District in the Plzeň Region of the Czech Republic. It has about 2,800 inhabitants. It is known for its former monastery.

Administrative parts
Villages of Babina, Horní Hradiště, Lomnička, Nebřeziny and Žebnice are administrative parts of Plasy.

Geography
It lies in the Plasy Uplands. The Střela River flows through the town.

History

The foundation of the town is connected with the foundation of the Cistercian monastery. The Plasy Monastery was founded in 1144 by then Prince Vladislaus II. The monastery experienced the greatest development during the reign of King Wenceslaus I, and its property gradually grew to cover 50 surrounding villages. The development of the monastery ended during the Hussite Wars, when it was burned down in 1421.

The entire 15th and 16th centuries mean a period of deep decline. After the Battle of White Mountain in 1620, the monastery's financial situation improved, most of it former properties were returned to it, and the construction of new buildings on the monastery grounds began.

The monastery was abolished in 1785 by decree of Emperor Joseph II. In 1826, the monastery building with the whole estate was purchased by Klemens von Metternich, who is buried here in the family tomb.

Demographics

Sights

The monastery complex is the most significant landmark of Plasy. It contains the former monastery, Church of the Assumption of the Virgin Mary, Baroque granary with the Royal Chapel of Saints Wenceslaus and Mary Magdalene, and abbot's residence. In 1661–1666 the church was rebuilt in the early Baroque style, and the new convent building was built in 1711–1740 by Jan Santini Aichel and after his death by Kilian Ignaz Dientzenhofer. Today the complex is open to the public and offers sightseeing tours.

The former cemetery Church of Saint Wenceslaus was built in the Gothic style and baroque rebuilt in 1690. After the abolition of the monastery, it was modified into the family tomb of the Metternich family.

Notable people
Mauritius Vogt (1669–1730), German geographer, historian, cartographer and musician; lived here
Klemens von Metternich (1773–1859), Austrian diplomat and politician
Václav Levý (1820–1870), sculptor
Viktor Stretti (1878–1957), painter
Rudolf Jung (1882–1945), German Nazi ideologue
Jiří Kornatovský (born 1952), painter

References

External links

Cities and towns in the Czech Republic
Populated places in Plzeň-North District